The 2006 Women's Dunlop British Open Squash Championships was held at the University of Nottingham in Nottingham from 12–18 September 2006. The event was won for the second consecutive year by Nicol David who defeated Rachael Grinham in the final.

Seeds

Draw and results

First qualifying round

Second qualifying round

Final qualifying round

First round

Quarter-finals

Semi-finals

Final

References

Women's British Open Squash Championships
Squash in England
Sport in Nottingham
Women's British Open Squash Championship
2000s in Nottingham
Women's British Open Squash Championship
2006 in women's squash